Punished, also known as Bou ying, is a 2011 Hong Kong thriller film directed by Law Wing-cheung. The film stars Anthony Wong, Richie Jen, and Janice Man.

Plot
The story starts with a real estate tycoon, Wong Ho-chiu (Anthony Wong), who is celebrating his wife (Maggie Cheung Ho-yee) and adult daughter Daisy's (Janice Man) birthday. Daisy wants to travel overseas, but Wong Ho-chiu gets into an argument with her and she runs out of the house. The next day, Wong Ho-chiu receives a cellphone video message of Daisy, who has been kidnapped, with her captors demanding ten million for her release. Wong Ho-chiu does not report this to the police, as he thinks it is his own daughter who has abducted herself and is requesting money for it. He warns the kidnappers that if anything happens to Daisy, he will stop at nothing to avenge her. Because of this threat, the kidnappers become agitated and decide to kill Daisy by leaving her bound, gagged and blindfolded, with a plastic bag over her head to suffocated her.

Meanwhile, Wong Ho-chiu asks his most trusted bodyguard, Chor (Richen Jen), to look for her. While searching, Chor manages to find the location of Daisy's body. When the news reaches Wong Ho-chiu, he is distraught to learns that his daughter is dead. He nonetheless lies to everyone by saying that Daisy is alive and was instead sent to L.A. Wong Ho-chiu turns to Chor to seek out the perpetrators and exact revenge. Wong Ho-chiu goes one step further and orders Chor to videotape each of their executions. Each time a videotape of the execution is sent to Wong Ho-chiu, he engages in a prayer. When the third perpetrator is tracked down, Wong Ho-chiu's wife gets to know about the matter and asks Wong Ho-chiu to stop the revenge killings. He refuses, leading to his wife leaving him.

During Wong Ho-chiu's medical check-up, his doctor told him that his assistant came to pick up Daisy's heart ailment medicine. Only then does Wong Ho-chiu realize who the final perpetrator is and requests Chor to bring him over, as he wants to kill that person himself. The final perpetrator turns out to be Daisy's female assistant. While fighting, she falls off the rooftop and it is revealed she has a daughter. When Wong Ho-chiu sees the daughter, he recalls Daisy's childhood and he has second thoughts of killing the assistant. They pull her up to safety and leave the scene. Chor and Wong Ho-chiu part ways afterwards.

Having taken revenge on his daughter's murderers, Wong Ho-chiu takes Daisy's ashes to Salar de Uyuni in Bolivia, a place she wanted to visit. He spreads her ashes before breaking down and crying.

Cast
 Anthony Wong as Wong Ho-chiu
 Richie Jen as Chor
 Janice Man as Daisy
 Maggie Cheung as Mrs. Wong
 Candy Lo as May
 Lam Lei as Pang
 Jun Kung as Pang's accomplice
 Charlie Cho as T.K. Chiu
 Elena Kong as Wong Ho-chiu's deceased wife
 Alan Chui Chung-San as Yao's ex-triad boss

Release
The film was released in Hong Kong on 5 May 2011.

References

External links
Official website

2011 films
Films directed by Law Wing-cheung
Hong Kong thriller films
2010s Cantonese-language films
2011 thriller films
Media Asia films
Milkyway Image films
Films set in Hong Kong
Films shot in Hong Kong
Films about kidnapping
Hong Kong films about revenge
2010s Hong Kong films